Streets of Rock & Roll is the seventh studio album by heavy metal band Keel, released in 2010. It marks the band's first studio recording since their 2008 reunion and is the first to feature new bassist Geno Arce.

Track listing
"Streets of Rock & Roll" (Brian Jay, Ron Keel, Dwain Miller) - 4:46
"Hit the Ground Running" (Jay, Keel) - 3:51
"Come Hell or High Water" (Marc Ferrari, Keel, Jay) - 4:00
"Push & Pull" (Ferrari, Keel) - 4:58
"Does Anybody Believe" (Ferrari, Keel) - 4:32
"No More Lonely Nights" (Keel) - 4:19 
"The Devil May Care (But I Don't)" (Ferrari, Keel, Jay) - 4:23
"Looking for a Good Time" (Jay, Keel, Ferrari) - 3:26
"Gimme That" (Keel) - 3:31
"Hold Steady" (Ferrari, Keel) - 3:55
"Live" (Keel) - 4:46
"Brothers in Blood" (Keel) - 3:52

Japanese edition bonus track
"Reason to Rock" (Keel, Jay, Miller, Kenny Chaisson) - 3:13

Personnel

Keel
Ron Keel - lead vocals, guitar
Marc Ferrari - guitar
Bryan Jay - guitar
Geno Arce - bass
Dwain Miller - drums

Additional musicians
Paul Shortino, Jaime St. James - backing vocals
Renée Keel - harmony vocals on "No More Lonely Nights"
Pat Regan - keyboards on "Does Anybody Believe"

Production
Pat Regan - producer, engineer, mixing
Paul Shortino - lead vocals tracks producer and engineer
Brad Vance - mastering

References

2010 albums
Keel (band) albums
Frontiers Records albums